Kuy Creek is a stream in the U.S. state of Texas.

Kuy Creek derives its name from the Kay family of settlers.

See also
List of rivers of Texas

References

Rivers of Calhoun County, Texas
Rivers of Victoria County, Texas
Rivers of Texas